Mary & George is an upcoming British historical drama television miniseries created by D. C. Moore and directed by Oliver Hermanus, based on Benjamin Woolley's non-fiction book The King's Assassin (2017).

Cast
 Julianne Moore as Mary Villiers, Countess of Buckingham
 Nicholas Galitzine as George Villiers, 1st Duke of Buckingham
 Tony Curran as King James I
 Laurie Davidson as Robert Carr, 1st Earl of Somerset

Production
The eight-part limited series is created by D. C. Moore, and Oliver Hermanus serves as lead director. Moore and Hermanus serve as executive producers alongside Liza Marshall for Hera Pictures and Sam Hoyle for Sky Studios.

In October 2022, it was announced Julianne Moore would lead Mary & George as Mary Villiers, Countess of Buckingham. Nicholas Galitzine joined the cast in January 2023 as Mary's son George Villiers, 1st Duke of Buckingham. Tony Curran and Laurie Davidson joined the cast in March 2023 as King James I and Robert Carr, 1st Earl of Somerset respectively.

Principal photography was underway in England as of January 2023, slated to begin in London. It was reported Knole House in Kent would be shut in late January and early February for filming.

Release
The series was presented at the MIPCOM in Cannes. NBCUniversal Global Distribution is handling international distribution on behalf of Sky. The series will premiere on Sky Atlantic in the United Kingdom. Sky will also air the series in Ireland, Germany and Italy. AMC Networks will release the series in the United States, Canada, Australia, New Zealand and India.

References

External links
 

Upcoming drama television series
2023 British television series debuts
2020s British LGBT-related drama television series
AMC (TV channel) original programming
Gay-related television shows
Sky Atlantic original programming
Television series set in the 17th century
Television shows based on non-fiction books